Frédéric Beigbeder (born 21 September 1965) is a French writer, literary critic and television presenter. He won the Prix Interallié in 2003 for his novel Windows on the World and the Prix Renaudot in 2009 for his book Un roman français. He is also the creator of the Flore and Sade Awards. In addition, he is the executive director of Lui, a French adult entertainment magazine.

Life and career

Beigbeder was born into a privileged family in Neuilly-sur-Seine, Hauts-de-Seine. His mother, Christine de Chasteigner, is a translator of mawkish novels (Barbara Cartland et al.); his brother is Charles Beigbeder, a businessman. He studied at the Lycée Montaigne and Louis-le-Grand, and later at the Institut d'Etudes Politiques de Paris and the CELSA Paris-Sorbonne. Upon graduation at the age of 24, he began work as a copywriter in Young & Rubicam, then as an author, broadcaster, publisher, and dilettante.

In 1994, Beigbeder founded the "Prix de Flore", which takes its name from the famous and plush Café de Flore in Saint-Germain-des-Prés. The prize is awarded annually to a promising young French author. Vincent Ravalec, Jacques A. Bertrand, Michel Houellebecq are among those who have won the prize. In 2004, the tenth anniversary of the prize, it was awarded to the only American to ever receive it, Bruce Benderson. Three of Beigbeder's novels, 99 Francs, Love Lasts Three Years  and Windows on the World, have been or will be adapted for the cinema. The film of Windows on the World will be directed by the French/English director Max Pugh.

In 2002, he presented the TV talk show "Hypershow" on French channel Canal +, co-presented with Jonathan Lambert, Sabine Crossen and Henda.  That year he also advised French Communist Party candidate Robert Hue in the presidential election.

In 2005, he was, with others authors such as Alain Decaux, Richard Millet and Jean-Pierre Thiollet, one of the Beirut Book Fair's guests in the Beirut International Exhibition & Leisure Center, commonly (BIEL). He worked for a few years as an editor for Flammarion. He left Flammarion in 2006.

His novel Un roman français was awarded the Prix Renaudot in November 2009. He has written columns in Le Figaro Magazine since 2010.

Literary work

Writing style

Frédéric Beigbeder's writing style includes both humour and self-mockery. His books are full of high-low cultural references.

Chronology of works

Novels and short stories 

He published his first Novel entitled Mémoires d'un jeune homme derangé which was published by La Table Ronde in 1990 when he was 25.

He published his second novel, Holiday in a Coma, in 1994, followed by Love Lasts Three Years, the last book of the trilogy of Marc Marronier, one of his main characters. Then, he wrote a collection of short stories entitled Nouvelles sous Ecstasy published by Gallimard.

In 2000, Frédéric Beigbeder was dismissed from the advertising agency Young & Rubicam after publishing his satirical novel 99 F (original title of the paperback edition: each edition in French and other languages was named after its actual retail price, for instance in the United States it was named $9.99, in Germany it became Neununddreißigneunzig and even its French title was changed after the Franc was replaced as the official currency by the Euro in 2001, as well as for the pocket edition) in which he criticized the advertising world, and which simultaneously turned him into a prominent author (that book generated significant press coverage, very good sales in the original French edition, and was later translated in English and several other languages).

He won the Prix Interallié in 2003 for his Windows on the World which takes place at the World Trade Center on September 11th, 2001. The English translation by Frank Wynne was awarded by the Independent Foreign Fiction Prize in 2005.

In 2005, he published L'Égoïste Romantique (The Romantic Egoist). In 2007, he published Au secours pardon, the sequel of 99F.

In 2008, he was arrested for snorting cocaine off the hood of a car in Paris in the 8th arrondissement. He was also in possession of 2.6 grams of cocaine. The arrest inspired his book A French Novel.

Comic books 

He also wrote comic books for a series called Rester Normal (Staying Normal), illustrated by Philippe Bertrand and published by Dargaud. The comic book was a caricature of the international jet-set. Two books were published : Rester Normal (2002) and Rester Normal à Saint-Tropez (2004).

Essays 

Frédéric Beigbeder published several essays. In 2001, in Dernier inventaire avant liquidation, he criticized the first 50 works of Le Monde's 100 Books of the Century, a list of the one hundred best French books of the 20th century.

In this essay, using his original writing style, Beigbeder commented on a mix of great novels, poetry, plays, as well as comic strips. In 2005, he published Je crois, moi non-plus, composed of a discussion about the Catholic religion between himself and Monseigneur Jean-Michel Di Falco, the Bishop of Gap.

In 2007, the publishing house Leo Scheer released a collection of books entitled Écrivains Aujoud'hui (Today's Writers), the first of which was dedicated to Frédéric Beigbdeder. The book was centered around a discussion between Beigbdeder and Angie David about his career and his literary work. In 2011, he commented on the 100 favourite books of the 20th-century in Premier bilan après Apocalypse, the sequel of Dernier inventaire avant liquidation.

Awards 

Frédéric Beigbeder was awarded the Prix Interallié in 2003 for his novel Windows on the World. He won the Prix Renaudot in 2009 for his autobiographic novel Un roman français.

Publisher 

From 2003 to 2006, he worked as a publisher in the French publishing house Flammarion. Within three years, he published 25 books for Flammarion.

Frédéric Beigbeder founded the Prix de Flore, which rewards young authors; he also serves as chairman of the jury. He also created the Sade Award in 2001 with Lionel Aracil. He was member of the jury of Prix Décembre from 2003 to 2010. Since March 2011, he has been member of the jury for the Prix Renaudot. In addition, he was jury member for the Prix Saint-Germain from 2011 to 2013 and for the Prix Fitzgerald.

Media

Advertising 

In 1990, he started his career in advertising as a copywriter and worked in various agencies for ten years, including over 5 years at the agency Young & Rubicam. Alongside his advertising career, he worked as a writer and as a literary columnist for a variety of French magazines such as Elle, Paris Match and Voici.

Cinema 

He is the co-author with Jean-Marie Périer of L'Attrape-Salinger, a documentary about J. D. Salinger. He plays himself in Les ruses de Frédéric (2007), a short film by Louis Skorecki, and also appears in Les infortunes de la beauté by John Lvoff (which he co-wrote), Hey Good Looking ! by Lisa Azuelos, Tu vas rire, mais je te quitte by Philippe Harel and La personne aux deux personnes by Nicolas and Bruno. He also appeared in the pornographic film La fille du batelier, by Patrice Cabanel, as a background character.

He makes several cameo appearances in 99 Francs, the film adaptation of his novel directed by Jan Kounen. He also aided in filming as well as writing the screenplay. As a director, he made Love Last Three Years starring Gaspard Proust, Frédérique Bel, Jonathan Lambert and Louise Bourgoin.

Press 

In 1996, he co-created a literary magazine called NRV (a pun with the word énervé, meaning angry). In 2003, he co-founded Bordel, another literary magazine (meaning literally brothel but mostly used nowadays as a curse word). Frédéric Beigbeder worked as a columnist for various magazines, including the French edition of GQ.

Since 2013, he has been the executive editor of the French magazine Lui. In 2012, he replaced François Nourissier for Feuilleton Magazine, a weekly supplement of Le Figaro Magazine.

Television 

From September 2005 to May 2007, he worked for the French TV show Le Grand Journal hosted by Michel Denisot.

In addition, he hosts Le Cercle, a TV programme of literary and film reviews broadcast on Canal+ Cinéma.

Bibliography

Novels 

 1994: Vacances dans le coma (translated into English as Holiday in a Coma by Frank Wynne)
 1997: L'amour dure trois ans (translated into English as Love Lasts Three Years by Frank Wynne)
 2000: 99 francs (Retitled 14,99 euros after the introduction of the euro), Grasset (translated into English as £9.99 by Adriana Hunter)
 2003: Windows on the World, Grasset (translated under the same title by Frank Wynne)
 2005: L'Égoïste romantique (The Romantic Egoist), Grasset
 2007: Au secours pardon, Grasset
 2009: Un roman français, Grasset (translated into English as A French Novel by Frank Wynne)
 2014: Oona & Salinger, Grasset
 2018: Une vie sans fin, Grasset
 2022: Un barrage contre l'Atlantique, Grasset

 Non-fiction books 

 2001: Dernier inventaire avant liquidation, Grasset
 2011: Premier bilan après l'apocalypse, Grasset
 2015: Conversations d'un enfant du siècle, Grasset
 2018: La frivolité est une affaire sérieuse, L'Observatoire
 2021: Bibliothèque de survie, L'Observatoire

 Discussions 

 2004: Je crois Moi non-plus : Dialogue entre un évêque et un mécréant Calmann-Lévy

 Comic books 

 2002: Rester normal Dargaud
 2004: Rester normal à Saint-Tropez Dargaud

 Films 
 2007: 99 Francs by director Jan Kounen
 2011: Beur sur la ville by director Djamel Bensalah
 2012: L'amour dure trois ans by director Frederic Beigbeder
 2015: Eva & Leon by director Émilie Cherpitel
 2015: Lolo by director Julie Delpy

 Personal life 

Beigbeder has admitted that many of his novels were broadly autobiographical, and that the character of Octave in both 99 francs and Au secours, pardon is in many ways his avatar. On the other hand, he contends that he is "more normal in real life than in [his] books" and that he is not like the characters in his books because he is actually too normal.

He is divorced and has a daughter, Chloé.

Frédéric Beigbeder married the French model Lara Micheli in the Bahamas, and had another daughter, Oona, with his new wife, in 2015.

 Editor's note 

The sections writing style, influences, literary genres and themes are based on the two following books :

 Frédéric Beigbeder et ses doubles, by Alain-Philippe Durand (including letters and an interview of the writer), CRIN 51 – 2008, 
 Frédéric Beigbeder by Angie David'', published in French by Léo Scheer, 2007, 

The aim was to comply with an author page template.

References

External links 
 "S.N.O.B. Site Non Officiel de Frédéric Beigbeder" 
 https://twitter.com/beigbedersays
 Short biography from the Berlin International Literature Festival

1965 births
Living people
People from Neuilly-sur-Seine
20th-century French novelists
20th-century French male writers
21st-century French novelists
French literary critics
French television presenters
Sciences Po alumni
Lycée Louis-le-Grand alumni
Lycée Montaigne (Paris) alumni
Prix Renaudot winners
Prix Interallié winners
Elle (magazine) writers
French male novelists
21st-century French male writers
French male non-fiction writers